Buttsbear Cross is a hamlet in the parish of Launcells, Cornwall, England.

References

Hamlets in Cornwall